Scinidae is a family of amphipods belonging to the order Amphipoda.

Genera:
 Acanthoscina Vosseler, 1900
 Ctenoscina Wagler, 1926
 Fortunata Chun, 1889
 Scina Prestandrea, 1833
 Spinoscina Bowman & Gruner, 1973

References

Amphipoda